Mike Hamilton (sometimes listed as Michael Hamilton) is an American guitarist, singer and songwriter.

Career 
Hamilton has performed, toured and/or recorded with Bette Midler, Sting, Jay Ferguson, Jennifer Warnes, Peter Kater, Jack Tempchin, Max Bennett, Pure Prairie League,  Kenny Loggins and many other music artists. Some of his original songs and compositions can be found on the following album/CDs and cassettes: Songs And Sounds The Same, Mike Hamilton -  Mementos 1971 - 1987, Pure Prairie League - Anthology, Mike Hamilton - Wind Of The East, Peter Kater - Best Of Laguna Vol.1, Coastal Soul Music. His guitar playing and singing can be heard and seen on the VHS, Laser Disc and DVD Release of Alive, Kenny Loggins and the VHS Release of Art Or Bust, Bette Midler.

Discography
 1978: Nightwatch, Kenny Loggins
 1979: Keep the Fire, Kenny Loggins
 1980:  Caddyshack: Music from the Motion Picture Soundtrack, Kenny Loggins  
 1980: Kenny Loggins Alive, Kenny Loggins
 1982: White Noise, Jay Ferguson
 1982: High Adventure, Kenny Loggins
 1983:  Twilight Zone - The Movie, Jerry Goldsmith, Jennifer Warnes
 1985:  "Step into the Light" & "Soldiers Eyes" Joseph Nicoletti Singer/Songwriter-Producer
 1987: Songs and Sounds The Same, Mike Hamilton
 1987:  Mementos 1971 - 1987, Pure Prairie League
 1995: Soundtrack from The IMAX Film "TheLiving Sea", Sting and Steve Wood
 1998: Soundtrack from the IMAX Film Experience "EVEREST", George Harrison, Steve  Wood, and Daniel May                                                 
 1999: Anthology, Mike Hamilton
 2000: Soundtrack From The IMAX Theatre Film "Dolphins", Sting and Steve Wood
 2002: Sometimes I Dream, Mario Frangoulis
 2007: Faces Of The Sun, Peter Kater
 2008: Wind Of The East, Peter Kater
 2008: "Liv The Dig", Mike Hamilton
 2012: "Impianoprov In Folktrancea ", Mike Hamilton

References
Press Clippings/Scrapbook
Discography on CD Universe

Newspaper article: "Hamilton at Cedar Creek" in The Orange County Register, Dana Point News, Music and Features, Thursday, Oct. 2, 2003 by Robert Kinsler.
Newspaper article: "Los Angeles Guitarist Gains Respect in Spokane" Spokane Chronicle, Empire Weekend Section, Friday Aug. 24, 1990, by Lana Baldwin.

Liner notes from the Kenny Loggins Columbia Records albums/CDs: "Nightwatch"(1978), "Keep The Fire"(1979), "Alive"(1980),  and "High Adventure"(1982).
Liner notes from the Jay Ferguson album/CD "White Noise" on Capitol, EMI, Magic Records (1982)(2000).
Liner notes from the Pure Prairie League album/CD: "Mementos 1971-1987" on Rushmore Records (1987).
Liner notes from the A&M Records CD: "Soundtrack From The IMAX Film The Living Sea"(1995).
Liner notes from the ARK 21 album/CD: "Soundtrack from the IMAX Film Experience EVEREST"(1998).
Liner notes from the Pangaea Records CD/album: "Soundtrack From The IMAX Theatre Film DOLPHINS"(2000).
Liner notes from the ARK 21 Records CD/album: "Soundtrack from the IMAX Theatre Film Journey Into Amazing Caves"(2001).
Liner notes from the Grammy Nominated Peter Kater album/CD: "Faces of the Sun" on Silver Wave Records(2007).
Liner notes From the Peter Kater and Sacred Earth album/CD:"Wind of the East" on Red Feather Music(2008).

External links
Official Site

Living people
American male guitarists
American male singer-songwriters
American session musicians
Year of birth missing (living people)
American singer-songwriters